The Illinois School for the Deaf (ISD), located in Jacksonville, Illinois, is a state-operated pre-kindergarten, elementary and high school for the deaf and hard-of-hearing. ISD uses both English and American Sign Language, with a policy modeled after the Wisconsin School for the Deaf.

ISD was founded in 1839 in the county seat of Morgan County.

The school includes dormitories for its students.

References

External links

Jacksonville, Illinois
Public K–8 schools in Illinois
Public high schools in Illinois
Schools for the deaf in the United States
Schools in Morgan County, Illinois
Public K-12 schools in the United States
Public boarding schools in the United States
Boarding schools in Illinois